Pen railway station is a railway station on the Panvel–Roha route of Central Railway in India. It is at a distance of 103.59 km from Chhatrapati Shivaji Terminus via . Its station code is PEN. It belongs to the Mumbai division of Central Railway.

The station is situated in Raigad district of Maharashtra. Also, Dadar–Ratnagiri Passenger and Diva–Sindhudurg Passenger also has a halt here. These trains are being utilized completely by the local people but still there is a long pending demand to start Local trains on this route both slow and fast services, for the convenience of the passengers. It'll also facilitate office-goers who goes to SoBo or Mumbai Suburbs on a regular basis.

There's a goods train's line bifurcating from main line and goes to a factory in Alibag. At present one needs to take an ST (State Transport) bus to Pen and then take a train or ST bus to Panvel, from where they can easily board the Local trains to Mumbai.

References

Railway stations in Raigad district
Mumbai Suburban Railway stations
Panvel-Roha rail line